Clifford R. Dodd was an administrator and radio expert, with twenty years experience in broadcasting in Australia, before he arrived in Sri Lanka. He was sent by the Australian Government under the Colombo Plan to work in Radio Ceylon. He was appointed Director of the newly formed Commercial Service of Radio Ceylon.

The Colombo Plan was established in July 1951 to provide economic aid to areas of south and southeast Asia. The Headquarters are in Colombo, the former capital city of Sri Lanka.

Founder of the Commercial Service 
Dodd, arriving in Colombo in the early 1950s, soon created the infrastructure of the Commercial Service of Radio Ceylon and made it into a successful brand. Dodd hand picked some of the best Ceylonese talents around and trained them as broadcasters. The announcers trained in the 1950s by Clifford Dodd and Livy Wijemanne went on to become legendary announcers of the Commercial Service of Radio Ceylon, among them: Vernon Corea, Tim Horshington, Greg Roskowski, Jimmy Bharucha, Christopher Greet and others. One of Dodd's protégés, Vernon Corea was appointed as the BBC's Ethnic Minorities Adviser – the first Asian to be appointed to senior management at the BBC in 1978. It was under Dodd's tenure that the Indian announcer Ameen Sayani was brought into launch Binaca Geetmala, a countdown of Hindi filmi music on the All Asia Service. It enjoyed iconic status across India.

The training at Radio Ceylon was rigorous, Dodd wanted the highest standards in broadcasting. He has the rare honour of being immortalised in a cartoon by the famous Sri Lankan cartoonist Aubrey Collette who published a cartoon titled ' Odd Man Dodd.'

Radio Ceylon – King of the Airwaves 

Dodd created a positive business environment in Radio Ceylon. Dodd was a charismatic figure who had firm leadership skills. His arrival in Torrington Square created a real buzz in broadcasting circles in Ceylon. Clifford R.Dodd changed the face of broadcasting in the island. He upgraded the Hindi Service of Radio Ceylon. Millions of listeners in the Indian sub-continent wrote in and tuned into the radio station, the oldest in South Asia. Dodd was a prime mover in attracting advertisers who were aiming at the vast Indian market via the medium of radio.

The Introduction of tough measures 

Dodd brought in tough new measures, some were not popular. He maintained that some Radio Ceylon staff, including the announcers who were on the payroll, were not entitled to permanency, or to retire on a pension. Radio Ceylon announcer, Mervyn Jayasuriya, observed: 'His credo as I have said before, was Hire and Fire.' Dodd claimed at a meeting with Radio Ceylon Director General John Lampson, and a senior civil servant Mr. M. Rajendra, who was Permanent Secretary to the Minister of Broadcasting, that an officer was entitled to a pension if that officer had served the government for one or two decades. If however an announcer lost his voice during that period, he would be unable to work, and Radio Ceylon should have the ability to get rid of him, argued the Director of the Commercial Service. Mervyn Jayasuriya who presented the case for the announcers said:  "Gentlemen, just as an announcer might lose his voice and so become a liability, so can a surgeon lose his eyesight, and a Director or Administrator lose his sanity and become useless to the service of the State. Is there a little bias here, or am I just being silly?" The announcers won the day.

The Father of Commercial Broadcasting in Ceylon 

Clifford R. Dodd is widely regarded as the Father of Commercial Broadcasting in Sri Lanka. Under his stewardship, Radio Ceylon reached the pinnacle of fame, fortune and popularity – millions of rupees poured into the station as a result of the success of the Commercial Service.

Dodd returned to Australia after his Colombo Plan assignment. He was succeeded by the first Ceylonese Director of the Commercial Service of Radio Ceylon, Livy Wijemanne.

See also
Vernon Corea
Colombo Plan
Radio Ceylon
Sri Lanka Broadcasting Corporation

Bibliography 
 Ceylon, Radio. – Standards of Broadcasting Practice – Commercial Broadcasting Division. – Radio Ceylon, 1950.

References

External links
Eighty Years of Broadcasting in Sri Lanka
English Presenters over the then Radio Ceylon – Daily News, Colombo

Australian radio personalities
Year of birth missing
Year of death missing
Australian radio executives
Sri Lankan people of Australian descent